Alan James Coleman (born 13 December 1983, Ashford, Middlesex) is an English cricket administrator. 

He is the current Middlesex Director of Cricket.  

Coaching career
In October 2021 he was appointed interim head coach of Middlesex following the removal of Stuart Law.

He was appointed as the club's first Head of Men's Performance Cricket in November 2021 before his promotion to Director of Cricket on 11 November 2022.  

He has also coached the Middlesex Cricket Academy and the Middlesex 2nd XI.

Playing career
Coleman represented Middlesex, the Middlesex Cricket Board and Dorset as a right-handed batsman and right-arm medium-fast bowler.

He made his 1st XI debut for Middlesex in a List A match against Sussex in the 2001 Norwich Union League. 

He made two further appearances in that season's competition against Hampshire and Glamorgan, while in the following season's competition he appeared once against Gloucestershire.  In his four List A appearances for Middlesex, he scored 29 runs with a high score of 14 not out.  With the ball, he bowled a total of 16.1 wicketless overs.

Also during the 2002 season, Coleman played a single MCCA Knockout Trophy match each for Dorset against Devon and the Middlesex Cricket Board against the Northamptonshire Cricket Board.

References

External links
Alan Coleman at ESPNcricinfo
Alan Coleman at CricketArchive

1983 births
Living people
Dorset cricketers
English cricketers
Middlesex cricketers
Middlesex Cricket Board cricketers
People from Ashford, Surrey